Kathryn 'Kate' Holroyd (born 5 June 1963) is a retired British rower.

Rowing career
Holroyd competed in the women's eight event at the 1984 Summer Olympics. The team finished in eighth place. The following year Holroyd was part of the double sculls crew with Jean Genchi that won the national title in a dead-heat with Sons of the Thames, rowing for Bradford Amateur Rowing Club, at the 1985 National Rowing Championships. The race was the first dead heat for winners since the start of the Championships.

She represented England and won a silver medal in the eight and a bronze medal in the coxed four at the 1986 Commonwealth Games in Edinburgh, Scotland.

References

External links
 

1963 births
Living people
British female rowers
Olympic rowers of Great Britain
Rowers at the 1984 Summer Olympics
Sportspeople from Bradford
Commonwealth Games medallists in rowing
Commonwealth Games silver medallists for England
Commonwealth Games bronze medallists for England
Rowers at the 1986 Commonwealth Games
Medallists at the 1986 Commonwealth Games